Tercero (Barrio Tercero) is one of the 31 barrios of the municipality of Ponce, Puerto Rico.  Together with Primero, Segundo, Cuarto, Quinto, and Sexto, Tercero is one of the municipality's six core urban barrios. It was organized in 1878.

Location
Tercero is an urban barrio located in the southern section of the municipality, within the Ponce city limits, and east of the traditional center of the city, Plaza Las Delicias.

Boundaries

Barrio Tercero is bounded on the North by Isabel Street, on the South by Comercio/Francisco Parra Duperón Street, on the West by Plaza Degetau and Plaza Munoz Rivera Streets, and on the East by Rio Portugues.

In terms of barrio-to-barrio boundaries, Tercero is bounded in the North by Barrio Quinto, in the South by Cuarto, in the West by Segundo, and in the East by Machuelo Abajo and San Antón.

Features and demographics
In 2000, Tercero had  of land area and no water area. The population of Tercero was 773. The population density in Tercero was 10,134 persons per square mile.

In 2010, it had  of land area and no water area. Its population was 668 persons, and it had a density of 8,350 persons per square mile.

Notable landmarks
Tercero is home to many city landmarks.  The Antonio Arias Ventura promenade, Ponce History Museum, Tricentennial Park, Teatro La Perla, and the Museum of Puerto Rican Music are all located in Barrio Tercero. Also, the NRHP-listed Banco de Ponce, Ponce High School, Banco Crédito y Ahorro Ponceño, and Salazar-Candal House are found in Barrio Tercero as well.

Gallery

See also

 List of communities in Puerto Rico

References

External links

 A 1911 picture of Calle Cristina, in Barrio Tercero, looking west from Calle Mayor, with Parque de Bombas visible at the end. Accessed 14 July 2020.
 A 1911 picture of Calle Comercio, Barrio Tercero's southern boundary (Barrio Tercero is the left side of the street), looking east from Calle Marina at Plaza Degetau. Accessed 14 July 2020.

Barrio Tercero
1878 establishments in Puerto Rico